KFS may refer to:
Karate Fighting System of the Jack and Jill School, Bacolod City, Philippines 
Kenya Ferry Service, which operates the Likoni Ferry
King Features Syndicate, an American print syndication company
Klippel–Feil syndrome, a rare congenital condition
Knives, Forks and Spoons Press, a British publishing company
Korean Fiber Society, an academic association
Koç Financial Services, a Turkish financial company that owned Koçbank
CloudStore, previously known as Kosmosfs
Kristeligt Forbund for Studerende, a Danish Christian student movement